The Uganda National Cultural Centre (UNCC) is a Ugandan statutory body that was established by the Uganda National Cultural Centre Act, a 1959 Act of Parliament (amended 1965).

Location
The headquarters of UNCC are located at the corner of Said Barre Avenue and De Winton Street, in the Central Division of the city of Kampala, Uganda's capital and largest city. The geographical coordinates of the headquarters of UNCC are 0°18'57.0"N, 32°35'21.0"E (Latitude:0.315833; Longitude:32.589167).

Overview
Officially inaugurated on 2 December 1959, UNCC is charged with:
(a) providing and establishing theatres and cultural centres in the country (b) encouraging and developing cultural and artistic activities and (c) providing a home to societies, groups and organisations that deal in art, culture and entertainment. The Honourable A.G. Mehta, mayor of Kampala in 1968, was a supporter of the National Theatre and opened its first exhibition on the Baháʼí Faith in Uganda.

Facilities
The centre has two main components: the National Theatre  and the Nommo Gallery, both of which are located in central Kampala. The National Theatre provides a venue for stage performances of different kinds, and also serves as a cinema. The Nommo Gallery features exhibitions of works of art by both Ugandan and foreign artists. The centre also offers a snack bar, which claims to offer the "best African dishes served with best spices and ambience", and the Craft Village, where locally made handicrafts are sold.

Management
Oversight of the UNCC is the responsibility of an eight-member Board of Trustees, appointed by the Minister of Gender, Labour and Social Development. The Board then appoints a management team and hires other employees. The current board was appointed in May 2019 to serve a three-year term. The current trustees are:

 Sam Kello Okello: Chairperson
 Cissy Mbabazi: Vice Chairperson
 Wilson Usher Owere: Member
 Juliet Jolly Kyobutungi: Member
 Edison Ngirabakunzi: Member
 Musisi Kiyimba: Member
 Naumo Juliana Akoryo: Member
 Fred Mutebi: Member

References

External links

Ugandan culture
Government agencies of Uganda
National theatres
Buildings and structures in Kampala
Entertainment venues in Uganda
Event venues established in 1959
1959 establishments in Uganda